They Planted a Stone is a 1953 British short documentary film directed by Robin Carruthers and produced by James Carr. It was nominated for an Academy Award for Best Documentary Short.

Synopsis
The film portrays how dams, barrages and irrigation canals were constructed on the Nile in Sudan, to generate hydroelectricity, irrigate the desert and create such projects as the Gezira Scheme.

References

External links

They Planted a Stone at Colonial Film: Moving Images of the British Empire

1953 films
1953 documentary films
1953 short films
1950s short documentary films
British short documentary films
Documentary films about Sudan
Documentary films about hydroelectricity
Irrigation in Sudan
Nile
1950s English-language films
1950s British films